Major General Guy Vernor Henry Jr. (January 28, 1875 – November 29, 1967) was a senior officer in the United States Army and a noted horse rider who competed for the United States in the 1912 Summer Olympics.

Early life

Guy V. Henry, Jr. was born into the military life. Son of Guy Vernor Henry, he went on to graduate from the United States Military Academy at West Point, New York in 1898, and distinguished his military career by earning the Silver Star in 1899 during the Spanish–American War.

Henry went on to study at the French Cavalry School in Saumur and used the knowledge he gained there to change the treatment and training of United States Cavalry horses. This included starting horses not by "breaking" them using the traditional western methods, but by training them on the longe, then slowly teaching them to accept the weight of a human on their back. He also brought dressage methods from both the French and German schools, with a great deal of influence from Baucher, and as senior instructor of equitation at the Mounted Service School at Fort Riley he insisted in teaching new recruits to properly use the aids and promoted the European methods. Henry helped to institute the high level of horsemanship at Fort Riley, helping to develop farrier and veterinary programs which were to become required courses for cavalry lieutenants. He also got rid of the harsh curb bit used by the Cavalry, known as the Shoemaker bit, and replaced it with either the snaffle bit or the double bridle.

Olympic equestrian career

Henry competed in all three Olympic equestrian disciplines – dressage, eventing, and show jumping – for the United States during his years in the army. His most distinguished Olympic results occurred at the 1912 Olympic Games in Stockholm, where he won the bronze medal in the team eventing competition, finished 11th in the individual event, 4th in the team jumping competition, and 13th in the individual dressage competition, riding Chiswell.

Henry later served at Chef dÉquipe for the United States Teams from 1936 to 1948, was chairman on the Olympic Equestrian Committee from 1930 to 1960, and director of equestrian events at the 1932 Summer Olympics in Los Angeles.

Other achievements
 Commandant of Cadets at West Point (1916–1918)
 Commanding General 15th Division (1918−1919)
 Graduate, Army War College, 1921
 Honors Graduate, School of the Line, 1922
 Graduate, General Staff School, 1923
 Commander of Fort Myer, Virginia (1927–1930)
 Succeeded Herbert B. Crosby as Chief of Cavalry, United States Army (1930–1934)
 Commandant of the US Army Cavalry School and Commander of Fort Riley (1935–1938)
 Commander of the Seventh Corps Area (1938-1939)
 Chairman of the US section of the Permanent Joint Defense Board with Canada (1948–1954)
 Judge at horse shows at the international level
 Director of the US Equestrian Team
 Director of the American Horse Shows Association
 Director of New York's National Horse Show Association
 President of the Fédération Équestre Internationale, the only American to be placed in that position (1931–1935)

Decorations

References

External links

 
 
 
Generals of World War II

1875 births
1967 deaths
United States Army Cavalry Branch personnel
Military personnel from Nebraska
Burials at Arlington National Cemetery
American dressage riders
Equestrians at the 1912 Summer Olympics
American event riders
Olympic bronze medalists for the United States in equestrian
American male equestrians
Recipients of the Distinguished Service Medal (US Army)
Recipients of the Silver Star
American show jumping riders
United States Army generals of World War I
United States Army generals
United States Military Academy alumni
Commandants of the Corps of Cadets of the United States Military Academy
Medalists at the 1912 Summer Olympics
United States Army generals of World War II
American military personnel of the Spanish–American War
American military personnel of the Philippine–American War
United States Army War College alumni
United States Army Command and General Staff College alumni